X Factor Georgia is the Georgian version of The X Factor, a show originating from the United Kingdom. It is a television music talent show featuring aspiring singers of all genres drawn from auditions from all across Georgia]. The show was broadcast on Rustavi 2 channel from 2014. The categories are: Boys, Girls, Kids and Groups.

Judges 
In 2016, Nina Sublatti was added to the show's judging panel, as well as Dato Porchkhidze, following the departure of Tamta in 2015.

2014 Georgia (country) television series debuts
Georgia (country) television series
Georgia
2010s Georgia (country) television series
Non-British television series based on British television series
Rustavi 2 original programming